The Council of Ministers of Abiy Ahmed is the cabinet of the government of Ethiopia during the premiership of Abiy Ahmed since early 2018.

Cabinet reshuffles and resignations
The Abiy cabinet of October 2018 was gender-balanced, with half the ministers being women, including several in senior security ministries, with Aisha Mohammed Mussa as Minister of Defense and Muferiat Kamil in the newly created Ministry of Peace, which was allocated responsibility for several security services. The number of ministers was reduced from 28 to 20. The other eight women ministers were Adanech Abebe, Dagmawit Moges, Ergoge Tesfaye, Fetlework Gebregziabher, Fitsum Assefa, Hirut Kassaw, Hirut Woldemariam and Yalem Tsegaye Asfaw.

In April 2019, Gedu Andargachew became Foreign Minister.

A January 2020 reshuffle replaced Fetlework Gebregziabher, a Tigray People's Liberation Front (TPLF) member, by Melaku Alebel as Minister of Trade and Industry, and shifted Getahun Mekuria from Innovation and Technology to Education.

A March 2020 reshuffle included shifting Adanech Abebe from a Minister to Ethiopia's first woman Attorney-General. The reshuffle included two new women ministers, promoting Lia Tadesse from State Minister for Health to Minister for Health, and Filsan Abdullahi became the Minister of Women, Children, and Youth. Some members of parliament viewed the reshuffle as reducing the representativity of Tigrayans, while member of parliament Tesfaye Daba stated that Lia Tadesse was partially of Tigrayan origin. Lake Ayalew became Minister of Revenue.

In November 2020, Demeke Mekonnen replaced Gedu Andargachew as Foreign Minister.

Filsan Abdi resigned from her ministership in September 2021 in relation to governmental obstruction of the publishing of a full report on sexual violence in the Tigray War.

Members

The Abiy cabinet has included (default source:)

References

Cabinets of Ethiopia